Pihigia is a Niuean surname. Notable Niueans with the name include:

 Fisa Igilisi Pihigia, politician and diplomat
 Molima Molly Pihigia, weaver and healthcare worker
 Togiavalu Pihigia, previous Speaker of the Niuean Assembly

Surnames of Oceanian origin